I:Scintilla is a post-industrial music band from Chicago, Illinois, currently consisting of Brittany Bindrim (vocals/lyrics), Jim Cookas (guitar/programming), Vincent Grech (drums), Dean Dunakin (bass) and Myles Arwine (guitar). They are currently signed to Belgian label Alfa Matrix.

To date, they have released four studio albums and four EPs.

History

Early years and The Approach (2002–2004) 
I:Scintilla was conceptualized in Champaign, IL in Jim Cookas' bedroom in October 2002. In January 2003, Chad Mines joined the group as bassist followed shortly by Jason Allen on guitar and programming in March. Upon formation, they immediately began writing their debut album, The Approach while still searching for a vocalist. Many singers were auditioned before finding Brittany Bindrim, who they found to be a perfect fit. The album was finished and self-released on July 29, 2004. The album contained early versions of many songs that would appear on later albums.

Alfa-Matrix and Havestar (2005–2006) 
After a previously full year of nonstop live performances, I:Scintilla was discovered and signed by Belgian electro label Alfa-Matrix. In March 2005, Jason Allen left the band and Chad Mines moved to guitar. Bethany Whisenhunt was brought on to play bass. The band continued to work on the release of its first EP, Havestar, while providing material for a future full-length album.

The Havestar EP was released by Alfa-Matrix in the summer of 2006. In addition to a few re-mastered songs from The Approach, remixes by Combichrist, Diskonnekted, Neikka RPM, Implant, and Klutae are included.

The Havestar EP also highlights the first collaboration with producer and artist Wade Alin, who is known for music works Christ Analogue, The Atomica Project, and Scanalyzer.  This collaborative process adds a consistent working sound quality that carries forward to I:Scintilla's following full-length album Optics.

After its release, Havestar peaked at #13 on the Deutsche Alternative Charts Top 20 Singles list.

Optics and The Immortal Tour (2007–2008) 
I:Scintilla released their second full-length album Optics in June 2007. The album consisted of many older, reworked songs as well as multiple new releases. Optics was released in single-CD format as well as a two-disc edition, containing a second disc entirely of remixes by bands such as Combichrist, Clan of Xymox, and Ego Likeness.

While this album was being made, Mines and Whisenhunt departed the band. Instead of replacing the members, Jim Cookas began programming the bass parts and played all of the guitar parts.

Optics peaked at #6 on the Deutsche Alternative Charts Top 10 Albums list, and was featured in multiple alternative magazines.
Preceding the album release, I:Scintilla performed at Wave-Gotik-Treffen in May 2007.

I:Scintilla joined with the then-Tallahassee-based darkwave band The Crüxshadows and Canadian electro act Ayria for the U.S. stretch of The Crüxshadows' Immortal Tour in 2008. At this point, the band incorporated two new members, Justin Pogue (keytarist) and Vincent Grech (drums). Up until then, the drums had all been done through a drum machine.

Dying & Falling (2009–2011) 
In 2009, keytarist Justin Pogue left the band and moved to Florida, where he was a DJ under the name DJ Halon at the now-closed Club Rayn's popular Industrial music and Alternative Rock night, Blue Monday. In the band he was replaced by Brent Leitner (guitar/programming).

On December 4, 2009, I:Scintilla released an EP titled Prey On You. The EP contained three new songs and five remixes of these songs. Two songs, Prey On You and Ammunition, were later released on I:Scintilla's third full-length album Dying & Falling (formerly called Redshift), which was released on November 26, 2010. Like Optics, this album was released with a single disc version and a limited edition containing a second disc. This second disc contained the third song from the Prey On You, another previously unreleased track, and nine remixes.

Over the next year I:Scintilla toured lightly, with most of their shows being in their hometown of Chicago. Around December 2012, Brandon Chase was brought in to fill the long empty bass position, making the band a quintet. However, he left I:Scintilla the following August to focus on his own bands.

Marrow EPs (2012–present) 
In 2012, I:Scintilla announced they would be releasing a series of EPs entitled "Marrow". The first of these EPs, Marrow 1, was released on October 15, 2012. This album was a dramatic change in musical styles. Abandoning their signature metal-electronica style, this album had a more acoustic sound to it. With five tracks, Marrow 1 contained one new song, Drag Along, two reworked versions from songs previously on Dying & Falling, as well as two covers.

Shortly after the December 12, 2012, release of Marrow 1, a new single was digitally released containing a new song, Skin Tight, and two remixes of Skin Tight. A month later, I:Scintilla announced a remix contest for Skin Tight as well as a new album, Marrow 2. The winning remix artist would have their song featured on the upcoming album. The band received 64 submissions and allowed their fan base to vote on which song should be included on the album. The votes were cast in a unique fashion counting cash donations as votes. All proceeds from the votes were donated to the Amnesty International charity.

Marrow 2 was released on May 2, 2013, and marked a return to their signature style. The album contains four new studio recordings as well as four remixes.

In January 2013, Brittany Bindrim launched her own company, Black Dove Design Company. The company focuses on graphic design, programming, and fine arts. The Marrow series album covers are all illustrated by Brittany and are part of her illustration portfolio for Black Dove.

On September 21, 2018, i:Scintilla released Swayed, their first full-length studio album in nine years.

Band members

Current members 
 Jim Cookas – lead guitar, programming (2002–present)
 Brittany Bindrim – vocals (2003–present)
 Vincent Grech – drums (2006–present)
 Dean Dunakin – bass (2015–present)

Former members 
 Jason Allen – rhythm guitar, programming (2003–2005)
 Chad Mines – bass (2003–2005), rhythm guitar (2005–2008)
 Bethany Whisenhunt – bass (2005–2006)
 Justin Pogue – keytar (2008–2009)
 Brent Leitner – rhythm guitar, programming (2009–2013)
 Brandon Chase – bass (2011–2012)
 John Freriks – rhythm guitar (2013–2017)
 Myles Arwine – rhythm guitar (2018–2022)

Timeline

Discography

Studio albums 
The Approach – 2004 – self-released
Optics – 2007 – Alfa Matrix
Dying & Falling – 2010 – Alfa Matrix
Swayed – 2018 – Alfa Matrix

Singles and EPs 
Havestar – 2006 – Alfa Matrix
Prey On You – 2009 – Alfa Matrix
Marrow 1 – 2012 – Alfa Matrix
Skin Tight – 2012 – Alfa Matrix
Marrow 2 – 2013 – Alfa Matrix
Carmena Saturna – 2018 – Alfa Matrix
Boxing Glove – 2018 – Alfa Matrix
HEAD – 2022

Remixes 
Neikka RPM – Rise of the 13th Serpent Limited Edition Bonus CD
Neikka RPM – My Innocence is Gone (I:Scintilla Remix) (5:48) 
Manufactura – In the Company of Wolves
Manufactura – Deep Waters (Opheila's Descent Mix By I:Scintilla Vs. Destroid) (5:29) 
 Endzeit Bunkertracks [Act – IV]
Angelspit – Girl Poison (I:Scintilla Mix) (4:04)

Compilations 
OpeningBands.comp: A Snapshot of Champaign-Urbana 2003 – 2003
Fidelidad
Green St. Records: Playlisted – 2005
Capsella (Toxin Mix)
Advanced Electronics Vol. 5 – 2006
Capsella (Toxix Mix) 
Clubtrax Vol. 2 – 2006
Havestar (4:40)
Dark Visions – 2006
Capsella (Toxin Mix) (3:38)
 Endzeit Bunkertracks [Act II] – 2006
Havestar (Combichrist Mix) (4:40)
Gothic Compilation Part XXXIV – 2006
Scin (4:34)
Matri-X-Trax (Chapter 3) – 2006
Havestar (Combichrist Mix) (4:45)
Scin (4:33)
Havestar (4:43)
New Signs & Sounds 09/06 –  2006
Havestar (4:43)
Orkus Compilation 22 – 2006
Scin (3:31)
Re:Connected [2.0] – 2006
Havestar (4:39)
Sonic Seducer Cold Hands Seduction Vol. 63 – 2006
Havestar (4:46)
Sounds from the Matrix 003 – 2006
Capsella Bursa Pastoris (Toxin Mix) (3:37)
Sounds from the Matrix 004 – 2006
Scin (4:33)
WTII Records Sunday Showcase 2 Year Anniversary Sampler – 2006
Toy Soldier (Bounte Remix) (4:49)
Dark Summer 2007 • 1 – 2007
Translate (Broken Reception Mix by Manufactura) (4:47)
Extreme Degeneration 1 – 2007
The Bells (4:31)
Fuck the Mainstream Vol. 1 – 2007
Cursive Eve (5:37)
Gothic Compilation Part XXXVII – 2007
Cursive Eve (5:37)
Nacht Der Maschinen Volume One – 2007
Havestar (Combichrist Mix) (4:40)
New Signs & Sounds 06/07 – 2007
Cursive Eve (5:38)
Sounds from the Matrix 05 – 2007
Bolivia (5:38)
Sounds from the Matrix 06 – 2007
Toy Soldier (3:53)
The Giant Minutes to the Dawn – 2007
Bolivia (5:38)
Alfa Matrix Re:connected [3.0] – 2008
The Bells (Angelspit Mix) (5:01)
Sonic Seducer Cold Hands Seduction Vol. 82 – 2008
Salt of Stones (Exklusiv Live)
Alfa Matrix re:covered – a tribute to Depeche Mode – 2009
I Want It All
I Want It All (Essence of Mind mix)
Sounds from the Matrix 013 – 2012
Skin Tight (3:44)

References

External links 
 Official website
 Twitter
 Facebook
 ALFA-MATRIX (record label)
 I:Scintilla at Vampirefreaks.com

Musical groups established in 2000
Musical groups from Chicago
American industrial rock musical groups
American electronic rock musical groups